Ypsario or Ypsarion (also Ipsarion or Ipsario) is a mountain in Thasos island, Greece. At 1204 metres, it is the highest point of the island. It is most commonly reached by hikers via the village of Potamia, although it can also be reached from Theologos.

References

Landforms of Thasos
Mountains of Greece
Tourist attractions in the North Aegean
Mountains of the North Aegean
One-thousanders of Greece